Gagea granulosa is a Eurasian  species of plants in the lily family. It is native to Russia (European Russia and Siberia), Kazakhstan, China (Xinjiang), and Mongolia.

Gagea granulosa is a bulb-forming perennial up to 20 cm tall. Flowers are yellow to yellow-green.

References

External links
Plantarium, Gagea granulosa Turcz. Описание таксона in Russian with several color photos

granulosa
Flora of Russia
Flora of Asia
Plants described in 1854
Taxa named by Nikolai Turczaninow